Belmond Hotel das Cataratas is the only hotel in Iguassu National Park, a UNESCO World Heritage Centre in Brazil, and has access to Iguassu Falls.

The two storey Portuguese colonial style building first opened as a hotel in 1958. Two further wings were added in 1971 and 1982.

The hotel comprises a main building which houses the reception area, a bar and restaurant with terrace and an outdoor pool area with a casual restaurant.

The hotel was the first property in Latin America to qualify for the ISO 14001 Environmental Management certification in recognition of its ecological operating policies.

In 2007 the hotel was acquired by Orient-Express Hotels, which embarked on a US$20 million refurbishment programme (completed in 2010). In 2014 the company changed its name to Belmond Ltd. At that time the hotel was renamed Belmond Hotel das Cataratas 

In 2018, Belmond Hotel das Cataratas was the first five-star hotel in South America to win a "Star Awards" from Forbes Travel Guide.

References

Further reading
Orient Express – A personal Journey by James Sherwood

External links 
 

Belmond hotels
Hotels in Brazil
Hotels established in 1958